Merv Griffin Enterprises was an American television production company founded by Merv Griffin, in business for 31 years from March 1963 to 
July 1994.

History
The company was first established as Milbarn Productions on March 7, 1963, and later as Merv Griffin Productions on March 5, 1964. Griffin's first production under the Milbarn name was Word for Word. Griffin's second game show was Jeopardy! as Griffin's first production under the MGP name on March 30, 1964. In May 1965, his talk show The Merv Griffin Show returned to television. Griffin also created the game show Shopper's Bazaar, which changed its name to Wheel of Fortune on January 6, 1975 after Jeopardy! was canceled on January 3, 1975. Griffin revived Jeopardy! as The All-New Jeopardy! on October 2, 1978, though it was proven to be unsuccessful. Merv Griffin Productions also owned the post-production studio Trans-American Video (TAV) that was founded on June 29, 1981.

In 1982, the company joined forces with King World (now CBS Media Ventures) to syndicate a nightly version of Wheel of Fortune. The company also had the rights to syndicate The Merv Griffin Show. KW also distributed the first two pilots of Jeopardy! in 1983 and January 9, 1984. In 1984, Griffin expanded his company as Merv Griffin Enterprises and during the same year, Jeopardy! also returned to television on September 10. On May 5, 1986, Griffin sold the company to The Coca-Cola Company (then-owner of Columbia Pictures Industries) for $250 million during his semi-retirement. TAV, however, was not included in the deal. The company later became part of Columbia Pictures Entertainment on December 21, 1987, and was sold to Sony Corporation along with CPE's other companies on November 8, 1989.

Merv Griffin Enterprises was folded into Columbia TriStar Television (now Sony Pictures Television) on June 4, 1994. Jeopardy! and Wheel of Fortune were taken over by CTT starting in September of that year, while Griffin remained executive producer for both game shows until 2000. Griffin later founded Merv Griffin Entertainment on May 13, 1996.

Employees
One of the most prolific employees was Don Pardo. The others were Charlie O'Donnell, Jack Clark and Johnny Gilbert, who were announcers on Griffin shows. All of the above announcers also worked for Bob Stewart Productions.

Television programs
 The Merv Griffin Show (1962–1963; 1965–1986)
 Word for Word (1963–1964)
 Jeopardy! (1964–1975, 1983 pilot, 1984 pilot, 1984–present; production responsibilities assumed in 1994 by Columbia TriStar Television, Sony Pictures Television in 2002, and Sony Pictures Television Studios in 2020; distributed in syndication since September 10, 1984 by King World, now CBS Media Ventures)
 Let's Play Post Office (1965–1966)
 Reach for the Stars (1967)
 One in a Million (1967)
 Memory Game (1971)
 Wheel of Fortune (1975–1991, daytime version; 1983–present, nighttime version; production responsibilities assumed in 1994 by Columbia TriStar Television, Sony Pictures Television in 2002, and Sony Pictures Television Studios in 2020; nighttime version distributed since September 19, 1983 by King World, now CBS Media Ventures)
 The All New Jeopardy! (1978-1979)
 Dance Fever (1979–1987; co-production and distributed by 20th Century Fox Television)
 Headline Chasers (1985-1986; co-production with Wink Martindale Enterprises and Distributed by King World)
 Winfall (1988; unsold pilot for CBS hosted by Clint Holmes)
 Monopoly (1990; co-produced by King World)
 Super Jeopardy! (1990; co-produced by King World)
 Ruckus (1991; co-produced in association with Columbia Pictures Television)

References

Sony Pictures Television
Sony Pictures Entertainment
Television production companies of the United States
Mass media companies established in 1964
Mass media companies disestablished in 1994